In Greek mythology, Aconteus (Ancient Greek: Ἀκόντιος) may refer to the following distinct two individuals:

 Aconteus, an Ethiopian chief who was on Perseus' side at the moment of the fight between the hero and Phineus at the court of Cepheus, Andromeda's father. He was turned into a stone when he saw the head of Medusa.
 Aconteus, an Arcadian who fought in the army of the Seven against Thebes. He was killed by Phegeus, during the war.

Notes

References 

 Publius Ovidius Naso, Metamorphoses translated by Brookes More (1859–1942). Boston, Cornhill Publishing Co. 1922. Online version at the Perseus Digital Library.
 Publius Ovidius Naso, Metamorphoses. Hugo Magnus. Gotha (Germany). Friedr. Andr. Perthes. 1892. Latin text available at the Perseus Digital Library.
 Publius Papinius Statius, The Thebaid translated by John Henry Mozley. Loeb Classical Library Volumes. Cambridge, MA, Harvard University Press; London, William Heinemann Ltd. 1928. Online version at the Topos Text Project.
 Publius Papinius Statius, The Thebaid. Vol I-II. John Henry Mozley. London: William Heinemann; New York: G.P. Putnam's Sons. 1928. Latin text available at the Perseus Digital Library.

Metamorphoses characters
Characters in Greek mythology
Metamorphoses into inanimate objects in Greek mythology